Cool Springs was a historic home located near Carvers Creek, Cumberland County, North Carolina. It consisted of two sections: a -story Federal style coastal cottage form section dated to about 1815-1820 and a two-story,  Greek Revival style section dated to about 1825–1830.  Also on the property are the contributing barn; a late-19th century storage building; a mid-19th century one-story house, said to have been a school; and a spring house. The house has been demolished.

It was listed on the National Register of Historic Places in 1985.

References

Houses on the National Register of Historic Places in North Carolina
Federal architecture in North Carolina
Greek Revival houses in North Carolina
Houses completed in 1830
Houses in Cumberland County, North Carolina
National Register of Historic Places in Cumberland County, North Carolina
1830 establishments in North Carolina